The Zuo River is a river of Guangxi, China. It begins from the confluence of the Bằng River and Kỳ Cùng River near Longzhou and joins the You River ("Right River") near Nanning to form the Yong River. These rivers form part of the Pearl River system, which flows into the South China Sea near Guangzhou. The Zuo River historically was the main communication route in the area, linking the villages of the Zuo Valley to each other, to major Chinese centres to the north and east and to southern territories that are now part of Vietnam.

References

See also
List of rivers in China

Rivers of Guangxi
Tributaries of the Pearl River (China)
Rivers of Vietnam